Wallichia triandra is a species of flowering plant in the family Arecaceae that is native to South Tibet in China and also to the neighboring Arunachal Pradesh region of India.

Description
Fruits are red and oblong.

References

triandra
Flora of Tibet
Flora of Arunachal Pradesh
Least concern plants
Plants described in 1975
Taxonomy articles created by Polbot